The Shebelinka gas field is a natural gas field that was discovered in 1950 in Kharkov Oblast.

It began production in 1956 and produces natural gas and condensates. The total proven reserves of the Shebelinka gas field are around 18.4 trillion cubic feet (520×109m³).

References

Natural gas fields in Ukraine
Natural gas fields in the Soviet Union